The Sheldon M. Chumir Centre is a health centre located in Calgary, Alberta. The facility is administered by the Calgary Zone of Alberta Health Services.  The centre provides 24/7 Urgent Care services but is not a full-service hospital and does not admit any patients for overnight stays.

History
The Sheldon M. Chumir Health Centre opened early Spring 2008 at the site of the former Colonel Belcher Veterans hospital. The facility is named for Sheldon Chumir, an Alberta civil liberties lawyer and long-time Liberal Party Member of the Legislative Assembly for Alberta who represented constituents in Calgary in the provincial government.

On October 30, 2017, supervised consumption site was added to the centre.

Services/Facility 

The Centre provides 24/7 urgent care and other services such as diagnostic imaging, Calgary Laboratory Services, the Southern Alberta HIV Clinic (SAC), Sexual and Reproductive Health, STI Clinic, and all associated areas such as health records, support services, and admitting. and has been operational since April 1, 2008.

Reception 
Calgary Police Service reported in its report, a dramatic spike in crime and drug related calls since the addition of drug consumption site to the centre in October 2017 A 276% increase in drug-related calls in the buffer zone, a 47% increase in violence and  a 45% increase in break and enter compared to the three-year average, according to police.

References 
Health in Calgary

External links 

Calgary Health Region. Sheldon M. Chumir Centre